Anne Johnston (1932–2019) was a Toronto city councillor.

Anne Johnston may also refer to:

Ann Johnston (figure skater) (born 1936), Canadian former figure skater
Anne Tracy Johnston, owner of Johnston-Felton-Hay House

See also
Annie Johnston (disambiguation)
Anne Johnstone (disambiguation)
Anna Johnston (disambiguation)
Anne Johnson (disambiguation)